Mesogi is a village in the Paphos District of Cyprus, located 5 km north of Paphos. It's located 306 m above sea level. It receives approximately 540 millimetres of rainfall annually. For horse riding enthusiasts, Mesogi also has a horse ranch, which offers a walk in the nature of the area, riding on the horses.

References

External References 
Κοινοτικο Συμβούλιο Μεσόγης  http://www.mesogi.org/gr/html-26-___.html

Communities in Paphos District